Northwest Hounded Police is a 1946 American animated short film directed by Tex Avery, produced by Fred Quimby, and featuring Droopy and Avery's wolf character. A remake of Droopy's first cartoon Dumb-Hounded (also adopting elements from Avery's 1941 Bugs Bunny cartoon Tortoise Beats Hare), the short revolves around the wolf (an escaped criminal) on the run from Droopy, who is trailing the wolf in order to capture him. The title is a play on words on the film North West Mounted Police (1940).

Plot

The film opens with a view of "Alka-Fizz Prison", clearly based on the Alcatraz Federal Penitentiary. A prison sign informs viewers that "No Noose is Good Noose", a pun involving the phrase "no news is good news" and the use of the noose in executions by hanging. The Wolf is depicted as a prisoner in his prison cell. He uses a pencil to draw a "crude door on the wall outside his cell", then opens that door and escapes, making his way from the United States to Canada.

The scene shifts to the police headquarters of Mounty County, where a sign explains that "We Aim to Police". The chief of the Royal Canadian Mounted Police addresses a gathering of Mounties, seeking a volunteer who is willing to hunt the escaped convict. Sgt. McPoodle (Droopy) is effectively volunteered when all the other Mounties step back. Later, somewhere in the Yukon, the Wolf is running through the snow. He stops to read a series of Burma-Shave-style signs which contain a warning message for him: "Don't Look Now/ Use Your Noodle/ You're Being Followed/ by Sgt. McPoodle". He turns around, and the camera shifts left to reveal that McPoodle is indeed approaching his target. This sets the pace for most of the short, where the shifting perspective of the camera exposes the presence of Droopy in yet another location. He remains unnoticed and effectively invisible until that reveal.

The Wolf attempts to hide in a seemingly vacant cabin in the woods. He shuts the front door and seven more on top of it. He feels secure behind these eight doors, but then the camera shifts to reveal the presence of McPoodle within the cabin. The Mountie occupies a chair by the fireplace, calmly reading a comic strip. The Wolf reacts by re-opening all eight doors, only to find McPoodle waiting behind them. The Wolf manages to flee through the back door, though he finds McPoodle also standing behind that door.

The Wolf climbs the highest mountain of the area and finds refuge in its summit, within a bird nest. Only a single egg shares the nest with him. After declaring that McPoodle will never find him at that altitude, the egg then cracks and McPoodle emerges from inside. The Wolf immediately dives towards a lake in the vicinity of the mountain. He feels momentarily safe underwater, until he notices McPoodle among the schooling fish. Following several failed attempts to escape the pursuit, the Wolf ends up in a tiny atoll of the Pacific Ocean. There are only two rocks on its surface. The Wolf breaks the fourth wall to speak to the movie audience, explaining that he has caught on to the pattern of McPoodle's appearances and fully expects the Mountie to emerge from under the larger rock. At this point, McPoodle surprises him by appearing from under the smaller rock instead.

The Wolf proceeds to swim his way towards New York City. He runs in the streets of the City, and an accidental turn causes him to nearly run off the edge of the film. He saves himself and then seeks refuge in a movie theater, hiding among the audience. The film screened is a product of the Metro-Goldwyn-Mayer cartoon studio, and McPoodle greets him from the screen, causing the Wolf to again flee. The Wolf next seeks the services of a plastic surgeon and requests a new face. First he finds his new face to be a replica of McPoodle's and asks the surgeon to restore his original face. Then he thanks the surgeon for doing so, only to notice that the man's face has also changed to now look like McPoodle.

An increasingly desperate Wolf next attempts to commit suicide by feeding himself to a lion in the local zoo. Alive in the "belly of the beast", he finds himself sharing the space with McPoodle. His next attempt to escape is his final one, as he ends up back in a prison cell. He then speaks to the audience again: he realizes that McPoodle got him, but now that he has some time to recall the events of the pursuit he wonders whether "there coulda been more than one of them little guys". At this point, the camera shifts to the corridor outside his cell where hundreds of McPoodle look-alikes have gathered. They answer his question with one of their own, "What do you think, brother?"

Voice cast
Tex Avery as Droopy McPoodle
Frank Graham as Wolf, Chief, Dr. Putty-Puss
William Hanna as Wolf's screams

Production
Jeff Lenburg comments that one of the animators of the film was Preston Blair, who produced some of his best work while working under Tex Avery, including this film.  He cites as other examples Red Hot Riding Hood (1943), Screwball Squirrel (1944), Batty Baseball (1944), The Shooting of Dan McGoo (1945), Lonesome Lenny (1946), and Red Hot Rangers (1947). His work under Avery ended in 1948, when Fred Quimby promoted Blair to a director in his own right. He and co-director Michael Lah worked on three films for the Barney Bear series, before Quimby decided to discontinue their production unit. In reaction, Blair left the Metro-Goldwyn-Mayer cartoon studio and started working for Terrytoons.

Bill Thompson, the regular voice of Droopy, did not do the character's voice in this cartoon; Tex Avery provided the voice, instead.

Analysis

The main humor of the film derives from Droopy inexplicably appearing wherever the Wolf goes, granting the character omnipresence. This was only the fourth film to feature Droopy, but it is essentially a remake of the first of them, Dumb-Hounded (1943). Both films actually recycle the gag of the seemingly omnipresent character from an even earlier film, Tortoise Beats Hare (1941). In that film, Cecil Turtle enlists his look-alike relatives to beat Bugs Bunny in a race.

The warning signs hint at two of the main themes of the film. One is the thin line between visibility and invisibility, the other is the sense that the pursuit of the officer is both relentless and inescapable. Scott Curtis argues that the film can be seen as a very sad comment on the lives of the animators themselves. The Wolf finds a way to escape through the power of his drawing pencil, suggesting emancipation through an artist's talent and creativity. But that promise of freedom is soon revealed as an illusion. In Curtis' view Avery and his crew had found themselves in a similar trap, having to draw hundreds of drawings of Droopy for every one of his films, to the point the character became a dominating presence in their lives.

Derek Hayes and Chris Webster cite Northwest Hounded Police as an example of an animated film where the empathy of the audience is reserved for the nominal villain, the Wolf. Because the audience can relate to his human-like frustrations, while Droopy here serves the role of a "boring hero". They define this type of hero as one seemingly flawless and invulnerable, effectively having nothing in common with the audience. Making it unlikely for them to identify with the hero, or feel empathy for him/her. They also argue that Droopy himself was never given a developed personality in his films, leaving the role of the real protagonist to whatever character shares the screen with him.

Jean-Marc Limoges cites the scene set in the movie theater as an example of Avery using metalepsis in his films. The Wolf among the film audience is greeted by Droopy (McPoodle) from the movie screen. Not only allowing the presence of a film within a film, but allowing the two films to interact.

Reception

In 1994, animation historian Jerry Beck published The 50 Greatest Cartoons, selecting and ranking animated short films according to a poll of 1,000 people working in the animation industry. Northwest Hounded Police was ranked 28th in the list. The only shorts directed by Avery which were ranked higher were Red Hot Riding Hood (1943, ranked 7th), King-Size Canary (1947, ranked 10th), Bad Luck Blackie (1949, ranked 15th), and Little Rural Riding Hood (1949, ranked 23rd).

In 1999, the Cartoon Network published its own list of Greatest 50 Cartoons. Northwest Hounded Police was ranked 27th. The only animated shorts directed by Avery which were ranked higher were I Love to Singa (1936, ranked 8th), King-Size Canary (1947, ranked 13th), Red Hot Riding Hood (1943, ranked 14th), Bad Luck Blackie (1949, ranked 15th), Ventriloquist Cat (1950, ranked 19th), Little Rural Riding Hood (1949, ranked 22nd), and A Wild Hare (1940, ranked 24th).

Sources

References

External links

1946 animated films
1946 short films
1946 films
1940s American animated films
1940s animated short films
1940s police comedy films
Canada–United States relations in popular culture
Droopy
Films directed by Tex Avery
Films set in a movie theatre
Films set in New York City
Films set in the Pacific Ocean
Films set in prison
Films set in San Francisco
Films set in Yukon
Films set on islands
Royal Canadian Mounted Police in fiction
Metro-Goldwyn-Mayer animated short films
Tex Avery's Big Bad Wolf films
Films with screenplays by Henry Wilson Allen
Short film remakes
Remakes of American films
Films produced by Fred Quimby
Films scored by Scott Bradley
Metro-Goldwyn-Mayer cartoon studio short films
1940s English-language films